Under Pressure: Cooking Sous Vide is a 2008 cookbook written by American chefs Thomas Keller and Michael Ruhlman. The cookbook contains a variety of sous-vide recipes, a technique Thomas Keller began experimenting with in the 1990s. The recipes in Under Pressure are those prepared in Thomas Keller's The French Laundry and Per Se restaurants. The book also contains sous-vide cooking techniques and tips, including discussions of cooking time, food temperature, and food safety.

Under Pressure has been called a definitive sous-vide cookbook. Tam Ngo of Serious Eats found that Under Pressures recipes "resist compromise and restrict substitution" and "are not always appropriate outside of the restaurant kitchen", due in part to the expensive equipment required to cook the dishes. Publishers Weekly found that the recipes were "so artfully arranged they would not be out of place in a modern art museum". The Washington Post was also ambivalent, finding that Under Pressures recipes "can be made only if the reader invests thousands of dollars in highly specialized equipment, and even then the dishes often demand days of preparation, not to mention weeks, months or years of practice".

References 

General references

2008 non-fiction books
American cookbooks